Tim Miller is an American political consultant and writer. He was a communications director for the Jeb Bush 2016 presidential campaign, and subsequently became an outspoken Republican critic of former U.S. president Donald Trump.

Campaign roles
A Colorado native, Miller started out in Republican politics as an intern working on the 1998 Colorado gubernatorial election. He later earned a bachelor's degree from the George Washington University School of Media and Public Affairs.

Miller was an Iowa staffer for John McCain in the 2008 Republican Party presidential primaries, and later served as national press secretary for the Jon Huntsman 2012 presidential campaign. In his role with the Huntsman campaign, Miller was credited by Esquire for making its daily email to reporters "surprisingly hip". After the primary, Miller joined the Republican National Committee as its liaison to Mitt Romney's 2012 presidential campaign.

In 2015, Miller was hired by former Florida governor Jeb Bush to be a senior adviser to his presidential exploratory committee, Right to Rise political action committee (PAC), and went on to serve as the communications director for Bush's presidential campaign. During the campaign, Miller drew notice as a "vocal critic" of Donald Trump. Following a 2016 South Carolina Republican primary debate, Miller followed Trump around the spin room heckling him until Miller was "hip-checked" by Trump campaign strategist Corey Lewandowski.

Anti-Trump advocacy
Miller joined the Our Principles PAC, an anti-Trump super PAC, following Bush's exit from the 2016 Republican Party presidential primaries, where he drew notice for lambasting Trump supporters with whom he appeared on-air.

After Trump's surprise election as president, Miller received media attention for announcing he had donated to Doug Jones, the Democratic opponent of Republican nominee and accused sex offender Roy Moore in the 2017 United States Senate special election in Alabama to fill Jeff Sessions' seat.

In 2020, Miller co-founded the advocacy organization Republican Voters Against Trump, which sponsored television and internet advertisements featuring lifelong Republicans explaining their decision to vote for former vice president Joe Biden instead of Trump, and served as its political director.

Miller has been characterized as a Never Trumper. He was included by The Washington Post on a list of Republicans "who hate Donald Trump the most". In November 2020, Miller announced he had left the Republican Party.

Opposition research
In 2013, Miller co-founded America Rising, an opposition research group focused on surfacing negative stories about Democrats, where he served as executive director. It was noted during the 2014 United States elections for deploying "trackers" to follow Democratic elected officials around Capitol Hill.

Following the 2016 United States presidential election, Miller joined Definers Public Affairs, an opposition research-styled consulting firm working for corporate clients. In 2018, they circulated a research document linking anti-Facebook activists with financier George Soros, often the subject of antisemitic conspiracy theories, on behalf of Facebook. As a result of the controversy, Facebook ended its work with Definers.

Media career
Miller has been described by Politico as one of the "most digitally fluent and social-media savvy" Republican operatives. Before the Definers controversy, Miller was a contributor to the liberal Crooked Media website and frequently appeared as the "token Republican" on its Pod Save America podcast.

He is a writer for The Bulwark and Rolling Stone. Miller has written in support of Omar Ameen, an Iraqi refugee accused by Trump of being a member of ISIS. A Rolling Stone column by Miller seeking on background comments from reluctant Republican Trump supporters elicited a widely shared quote, "There are two options, you can be on this hell ship, or you can be in the water drowning".

His memoir of working in Republican politics, Why We Did It: A Travelogue From the Republican Road to Hell, was published by Harper in June 2022. The book details Miller's political career, and analyzes the rise of Trump and the motivations of Republican politicians who remained firmly loyal to the MAGA movement. It reached #2 on The New York Times non fiction list in July 2022. The book was positively received for its writing style and analysis of political changes within the post-Trump GOP during the late 2010s and early 2020s. In a review for The New York Times, Jennifer Szalai called the book "darkly funny" and praised Miller's insights into the inner workings of the Republican Party and the Washington D.C. political scene. Conservative political commentator David French wrote that it offered "painful" insights into the impact of partisanship and Trumpism on the American conservative Right.

Personal life
In 2000 Miller graduated from Regis Jesuit High School in Aurora, Colorado, and in 2004 he graduated from George Washington University with a BA in political science.

Miller is openly gay. He attributes his decision to take the risk of coming out in 2007, while still working on Republican campaigns, in part to the Larry Craig scandal.

As of 2020, Miller lives in Oakland, California, with his husband and their child.

References

External links
 Tim Miller at The Bulwark (website) 
 Tim Miller at Ballotpedia

21st-century American male writers
21st-century American memoirists
American gay writers
American political commentators
American political writers
California Independents
California Republicans
Colorado Republicans
Criticism of Donald Trump
George Washington University alumni
Jeb Bush
LGBT conservatism in the United States
Gay memoirists
LGBT people from Colorado
Living people
Washington, D.C., Republicans
Writers from Oakland, California
Year of birth missing (living people)